Matthías Hallgrímsson (born 12 December 1946) is an Icelandic former footballer who played as a striker.

Career

Club career
Matthías played club football in Iceland and Sweden for ÍA, Halmia and Valur. He was topscorer in the Úrvalsdeild in the 1969 and 1975 seasons.

International career
Matthías scored 11 goals in 45 appearances for the Iceland national football team. 4 of those appearances came in FIFA World Cup qualifying matches.

References

1946 births
Living people
Matthias Hallgrimsson
Matthias Hallgrimsson
Matthias Hallgrimsson
Association football forwards
Matthias Hallgrimsson
IS Halmia players
Matthias Hallgrimsson
Matthias Hallgrimsson
Matthias Hallgrimsson
Expatriate footballers in Sweden